The Social is a Canadian daytime television talk show, which airs weekday afternoons on CTV and CTV 2. Using a panel format similar to American talk shows such as The View or The Talk, the show is hosted by Melissa Grelo (the show's moderator), Lainey Lui, and Cynthia Loyst. On Friday editions, Jessica Allen serves as an additional co-host.

The series covers news, lifestyle and entertainment topics, and places a strong emphasis on direct and live interaction with viewers through social media.

History
The show premiered on September 2, 2013, originally hosted by Grelo, Lui, Loyst and Traci Melchor with Allen as a digital correspondent for the show.

Grelo took a maternity leave from the program in spring 2014. A series of celebrity guest hosts appeared during her absence, including Jann Arden, Marilyn Denis, Wendy Crewson, Elisha Cuthbert, Arlene Dickinson, Arielle Kebbel, Emily Procter, Sarah Rafferty and Debbie Travis.

Melchor took a leave of absence from the show in 2016, with Marci Ien stepping in as a substitute host following the cancellation of Canada AM. Melchor later revealed that she took the leave of absence for mental health reasons, after bursting into uncontrollable tears while preparing for an interview with Lynn Keane, an author who had published a book about her son's suicide, leading Melchor to realize that she had not fully processed her grief over the 2015 death of her friend Chris Hyndman.

Melchor announced in March 2017 that she would not be returning to the program full-time, instead concentrating on her duties with eTalk, although she will occasionally still appear on the show as a substitute host when one of the regulars is away. Ien became a permanent cohost of the program in 2017. She left the program upon her election to the House of Commons of Canada for the federal electoral district of Toronto Centre in 2020.

Controversy

Jess Allen comments on hockey players 
On November 12, 2019, during a discussion regarding the firing of ice hockey commentator Don Cherry from Hockey Night in Canada, Allen said that she doesn't "worship at the altar of hockey" and found that those who did, in her experience, "all tended to be white boys who weren't, let's say, very nice." Allen also added, "they were not generally thoughtful, they were often bullies." Allen later clarified on Twitter saying, "I never said every white boy, just the ones whose unsavoury behaviour, which didn’t feel very Canadian, I witnessed. Because of this, I am guilty of having conflicted feelings about hockey being so closely linked to our national identity." On November 13, Allen acknowledged that she "struck a nerve with many people." The controversy resulted in social media backlash, including the hashtag #FireJessAllen, and the Canadian Broadcast Standards Council issuing a notice on their website that they had received "a large number of similar complaints" and that "no further complaints will be accepted by the CBSC on this issue." On November 14, CTV issued a statement apologizing to "everyone who was offended by the remarks," however they wouldn't restrict their hosts from "offering their opinions on an opinion show," but they will "always listen to viewers when they offer theirs." Allen also issued an apology saying she was only speaking about hockey players she knew personally, and that Don Cherry reminded her of them; however, she couldn't "apologize to the very specific hockey players" she was originally referring to.

International broadcasts
The series began airing in syndication in the United States through PPI Releasing and Sony Pictures Television via selective markets since September 2015, although a few stations had started airing the show during a test run prior to the push to expand it in more American television markets. It had been targeted for a soft 2014 US launch but was held back in order to give the show enough time to find its footing.

References

External links

2013 Canadian television series debuts
2010s Canadian television talk shows
2020s Canadian television talk shows
CTV Television Network original programming
CTV 2 original programming
Television series by Bell Media
Television series by Sony Pictures Television
Television shows filmed in Toronto
Television series about social media
Television productions suspended due to the COVID-19 pandemic